The 1895–96 Scottish Districts season is a record of all the rugby union matches for Scotland's district teams.

History

Glasgow District and Edinburgh District fought out a nil - nil draw in the Inter-City match. This was the first draw in the fixture since 1879; and the first nil-nil since January 1876 (back when the Inter-City was a twice-a-season format).

The North of Scotland played Edinburgh Wanderers at the end of the season. It was intended to be a XV a side match, North had selected their side, but it seems likely that Wanderers only turned up with XI players so a XI a side match had to be played instead.

Results

Inter-City

Glasgow District:

Edinburgh District:

Other Scottish matches

North of Scotland:

South of Scotland: 

Provinces:

Cities: 

North of Scotland:

Edinburgh Wanderers:

English matches

No other District matches played.

International matches

No touring matches this season.

References

1895–96 in Scottish rugby union
Scottish Districts seasons